The 1956 South Carolina United States Senate special election was held on November 6, 1956 to select the U.S. Senator from the state of South Carolina simultaneously with the regular Senate election.  The election resulted from the resignation of Senator Strom Thurmond on April 4, 1956, who was keeping a campaign pledge he had made in the 1954 election.  Thurmond was unopposed in his bid to complete the remaining four years of the term.

Democratic primary
Senator Strom Thurmond faced no opposition from South Carolina Democrats and avoided a primary election.  There was a possibility that Governor George Bell Timmerman Jr. might enter the race, but Thurmond was held in such high regard by the voters that there would have been no chance of defeating him.  With no challenge to the remainder of the term, Thurmond did not conduct a campaign and rejoined his old law firm in Aiken until he returned to the Senate after the general election.

Election results

 

|-
| 
| colspan=5 |Democratic hold
|-

References
"Supplemental Report of the Secretary of State to the General Assembly of South Carolina." Reports and Resolutions of South Carolina to the General Assembly of the State of South Carolina. Volume I. Columbia, SC: 1957, pp. 8–9.

See also
List of United States senators from South Carolina
1956 United States Senate elections
1956 United States Senate election in South Carolina

South Carolina 1956
South Carolina 1956
1956 Special
South Carolina Special
United States Senate Special
Single-candidate elections
United States Senate 1956
Strom Thurmond